Severino "Nonoy" Marcelo (January 22, 1939 – October 22, 2002) was a Filipino cartoonist born in Malabon, Metro Manila, Philippines, an alumnus of the Institute of Arts and Sciences from Far Eastern University, and a former cartoonist in The Advocate (the official student publication of Far Eastern University), best known for creating the character Ikabod Bubwit (literally "Ikabod the Small Rodent" or "Ikabod the Small Mouse" in Tagalog) in the comic strip Ikabod. He also created the comic strips Plain Folks, which appeared in the Daily Mirror during the early 1960s, and Tisoy in 1963 for the Manila Times, which tells about the lifestyle of young Filipinos. His main character, Tisoy (slang for "mestizo"), and cast members such as Aling Otik, Maribubut, Caligula, Tatang, Tikyo and Kinse, soon became established in Philippine pop culture.

Tisoy became a 1977 film directed by Ishmael Bernal, starring Christopher de Leon and Charo Santos.

Ikabod ran from the late 1970s to 2002. It was a satirical strip that re-cast the Philippines as a nation called Dagalandia. The strip humorously depicted the socio-political woes of ordinary Filipinos, as represented by the tailless Everymouse hero, Ikabod - who became as iconic in his own way as that other popular cartoon rodent, Mickey Mouse. Marcelo often used the strip to caricature political figures from Ferdinand Marcos and Corazon Aquino to Joseph Estrada and Gloria Macapagal Arroyo, re-imagining them as mice.

In 1985, Marcelo was given the Catholic Mass Media Award for print journalism, a category usually given to reporters or columnists. In 1998, Marcelo received the Cultural Center of the Philippines' Centennial Artist Award, the only cartoonist so honored.

Death
Nonoy Marcelo died in Manila on October 22, 2002, at the age of 63. He died of sepsis due to complications from his diabetes.

External links
 A sample Ikabod strip (in Tagalog)
 A eulogy to Nonoy Marcelo on WittyWorld
 Ptyk is home, an article memorializing his life
 An article about Nonoy Marcelo
 Nonoy Marcelo Obituary
  Nonoy Marcelo's Sense of the Absurd by Eric S. Caruncho
 Tinig.com, "Nonoy Marcelo" by Alexander Martin Remollino
 Nonoy Marcelo's gone by Joan Orendain
 Nonoy Marcelo on Philippine Comics

1939 births
2002 deaths
Comic strip cartoonists
Filipino cartoonists
Filipino writers of bilingual works
Filipino illustrators
People from Malabon
Artists from Metro Manila
Far Eastern University alumni